Where in the World Is Carmen Sandiego? is the soundtrack to the game show of the same name that ran from 1991 to 1995. Rockapella, the house band on the show throughout its entire run, performed six of the ten songs on the album.

Development 
Rockapella had been hired as the game show's house band when the show's producer saw the group on the special Spike Lee & Company: Do It a Cappella and felt their sound could appeal to a young audience. The group was surprised by their success, given the show's target audience of children, in contrast to their previous target market of adults in their 20s-40s. Rockapella toured prior to releasing the album.

Following the premiere of the game show, some of the songs in the album are related to geography, such as "Capital", which lists the state capitals of the United States. However, other songs have no geographic basis, and many include witty humor aimed to adults. Rockapella member Barry Carl said of the lyrics: "We don't wish to talk down to teens - they're more sophisticated." The album features multiple genres, including ska ("Beautiful Place"), salsa ("Amazing World"), rock ("Feeling Fine"), and Celtic pop ("The Violin").

Track listing

Notes
 Track 2 includes a spoken interlude performed by Greg Lee as a New York City Subway announcer.
 Track 4 includes an instrumental interlude performed by Jerry O'Sullivan on uillean pipes.
 Track 6 includes an interlude skit in which Pierre, South Dakota then-mayor Gary Drewes leaves a message on Rockapella's answering machine, protesting Pierre's omission from "Capital."
 Track 9 includes a spoken interlude performed by Lee and a chorus of schoolchildren introducing Rockapella.

Personnel
 David Yazbek, Sean Altman – Producers, executive producers
 Billy Straus – Producer, engineer
 Mike Scalcione – Assistant engineer
 Jed Alpert – Co-executive producer
 Greg Lee – Voice (himself, subway announcer)
 Pierre, South Dakota mayor Gary L. Drewes – Voice (himself)

"Capital," "Everything to Me," "My Home," "Let's Get Away From It All," "Indiana," "Where in the World Is Carmen Sandiego?":
Rockapella – Vocals
Sean Altman – Tenor
Elliott Kerman – Baritone
Barry Carl – Bass
Scott Leonard – High tenor
David Yazbek – Vocal percussion
"Capital":
David Yazbek, Sean Altman, Billy Straus – Arrangement
Karl Atkins, Jenny Grooby, Angela Howe, Lisa Leonard, Angie Schworer, Anne B. White – Chorus
"Everything to Me" and "Where in the World Is Carmen Sandiego?":
David Yazbek, Sean Altman, Billy Straus – Arrangement
"Beautiful Place (NYC)":
Urban Blight
Keene Carse – Lead vocals, drums
Dan Lipman – Lead vocals, guitar
Wyatt Sprague – Bass guitar
Paul Vercesi – Tenor saxophone
Tony Orbach – Baritone saxophone
Kevin Batchelor – Trumpet
Jamie Carse – Keyboards
David Yazbek – Additional percussion, arrangement
"My Home":
The Persuasions – Vocals
Jayotis Washington
Jerry Lawson
Joe Russell
Jimmy Hayes
Sean Altman – Arrangement

"Amazing World":
Tito Puente
Nestor Sanchez – Vocals
Mary Lee Kortes, Valerie Wilson, Steve Gutman, Elliott Kerman, David Yazbek, Sean Altman – Chorus
Steve Gutman, David Yazbek – Arrangement
"Feeling Fine":
3 Brave Woodsmen – Vocals
Burl Mann
Ian Jaeger
Norm Raposbec
Keene Carse – Drums
Billy Straus – Guitar, bass guitar, arrangement
John Shelly – Acoustic guitar
David Yazbek – Organ, percussion
"Let's Get Away From It All":
Elliott Kerman, Rockapella – Arrangement
"The Violin":
Brian Dewan – Lead vocals
Eileen Ivers – Fiddle
Joanie Madden – Tin whistle
Jerry O'Sullivan – Uileann pipes
Jaime Rodriguez – Bodhran, spoons
Chris Bishop – Bass guitar
Keene Carse – Drums
Billy Straus – Guitar, chorus
David Yazbek – Guitar, chorus, arrangement
James Ducey – Chorus
"Indiana":
Sean Altman, Billy Straus – Arrangement

References

Rockapella albums
1992 soundtrack albums
Television soundtracks